Rebecca Ryan (born 27 April 1991) is an English actress, best known for her role as Debbie Gallagher in the Channel 4 comedy-drama series Shameless (2004–2009). Ryan also appeared as Vicki MacDonald in the BBC One school-based drama series Waterloo Road (2009–2011), Gemma Dean in the BBC One medical drama Casualty (2017–2019) and from 2021 to 2022, she appeared in the ITV soap opera Coronation Street as Lydia Chambers.

Career
Ryan's Northern Irish mother Maranna was the first World Irish dancing champion. Inspired by her mother, Ryan took up Irish dancing lessons at age three, competed in numerous competitions and ranked third at age 12. Ryan first followed her brother, Charlie Ryan, onto the stage at the age of six in a production of The Who's Tommy at Manchester Opera House. Ryan then starred as Debbie Gallagher in Shameless, which she began playing at the age of 11. Though she never had any formal training as an actor, she credits the time spent on the set of Shameless as a useful learning experience.

Ryan has appeared in various television series, including State of Play, Holby City and the CBBC series, Stupid!. In February 2006, she appeared in Emmerdale playing Bob Hope's (Tony Audenshaw) daughter, Carly Hope. She also appeared on Celebrity Big Brother 6 as part of a task. Ryan made her stage debut in Scarborough by Fiona Evans at London's Royal Court Theatre in 2008, and subsequently appeared in "Lost Monsters" at the Everyman Theatre in Liverpool. From 2009 to 2011, she appeared as pupil Vicki MacDonald in BBC One school-based drama series Waterloo Road. In January 2010, she played the part of Ellie McCall in a special five-part storyline in BBC daytime soap opera Doctors. In February 2011, Ryan appeared in Let's Dance for Comic Relief, with fellow Waterloo Road cast member, Philip Martin Brown. In May 2011, she played Maeve Summers in an episode of Casualty. She has also appeared as Grace in Monroe (2012), Erin Doyle in an episode of DCI Banks (2014) and Natalie Dixon in Doctors (2015).

In May 2014, Ryan toured in the production of A Taste of Honey Derby Theatre. In February 2015, Ryan starred in the Derby Theatre's Solace of the Road playing the characters Holly and Solace. The Derby Telegraph reviewer, Susie Brighouse, said of her performance: "Rebecca Ryan perfects the complex art of acting by a subtle change of tone to clarify what Solace is thinking, as well as deftly changing between the personalities of Holly and Solace throughout the play." Alfred Hickling of The Guardian wrote: "It’s hard to think of an actor more capable of veering between the ages of 12 and 27 at any given moment [than Ryan.]" Ryan featured in the second run of Beryl, written by fellow Shameless actress Maxine Peake, at the West Yorkshire Playhouse in June and July 2015, followed by an autumn 2015 tour around England. In 2017, Ryan began portraying hospital porter Gemma Dean in the BBC medical drama, Casualty. Ryan confirmed she had departed Casualty on 10 August 2019. In December 2021, she joined the cast of the ITV soap opera Coronation Street as Lydia Chambers. She confirmed that her exit would air in 2022 following the conclusion of Lydia's storyline.

Filmography

Awards and nominations

References

External links

1991 births
Living people
English child actresses
English people of Irish descent
English television actresses
English stage actresses
English radio actresses
English soap opera actresses
Actresses from Manchester
Performers of Irish dance
21st-century English actresses
English Roman Catholics